The FN SC-1 is an over-under double-barreled shotgun designed for sport.

References

Double-barreled shotguns
FN Herstal firearms
Shotguns of Belgium